The 2021–22 Czech National Football League (known as the Fortuna národní liga for sponsorship reasons) is the 29th season of the Czech Republic's second tier football league. Due to positive coronavirus tests on four players and additional players showing symptoms, the 12th and 13th round of matches for Varnsdorf, against Líšeň and Opava, were postponed.

Team changes

From FNL 
 Hradec Králové (promoted to 2021–22 Czech First League)
 Blansko (relegated to Moravian–Silesian Football League)
 Slavoj Vyšehrad (relegated to Prague Championship)

To FNL 
 Brno (relegated from 2020–21 Czech First League)
 Příbram (relegated from 2020–21 Czech First League)
 Opava (relegated from 2020–21 Czech First League)
 Sparta Prague B (promoted from 2020–21 Bohemian Football League)
 Vyškov (promoted from 2020–21 Moravian–Silesian Football League)

Team overview

Locations and stadiums
The home stadium of MFK Vyškov was not certified by the league to host matches. The club opted to play their home league matches for the season at Sportovní areál Drnovice in Drnovice.

League table

Results

References

External links
 Fortuna národní liga

2
Czech National Football League seasons
Czech Republic